Siham Boukhami (born 1 February 1992) is a Moroccan footballer who plays as a defender for AS FAR and the Morocco women's national team.

International career
Boukhami capped for Morocco at senior level during the 2018 Africa Women Cup of Nations qualification (first round).

See also
List of Morocco women's international footballers

References

1992 births
Living people
Moroccan women's footballers
Women's association football defenders
Morocco women's international footballers